Janusz Zawadzki (27 April 1931 – 19 January 1977) was a Polish ice hockey player. He played for Legia Warsaw and Górnik Katowice during his career. He won the Polish league championship twice, with Legia in 1953 and with Górnik in 1958. Zawadzki also played for the Polish national team at the 1956 Winter Olympics, and the 1957 and 1959 World Championship.

References

External links
 

1931 births
1977 deaths
GKS Katowice (ice hockey) players
Ice hockey players at the 1956 Winter Olympics
Legia Warsaw (ice hockey) players
Olympic ice hockey players of Poland
People from Sosnowiec
Polish ice hockey defencemen
Sportspeople from Silesian Voivodeship